Clottey is a surname. Notable people with the surname include:

Emmanuel Clottey (born 1987), Ghanaian  footballer
Emmanuel Clottey (boxer), (born 1974), Ghanaian boxer
Genevive Clottey (born 1969), Ghanaian footballer
Joshua Clottey (born 1977), Ghanaian boxer
Serge Attukwei Clottey (born 1985), Ghanaian artist

See also 
Manny Pacquiao vs. Joshua Clottey, was a welterweight fight for the WBO World welterweight championship